Roger Hagberg (February 28, 1939 – April 15, 1970) was a professional gridiron football player, who played running back for five seasons for the Oakland Raiders, and four seasons with the Winnipeg Blue Bombers.

Roger's family moved to Rochester, MN when he was young and he grew up there.  His father worked as a probation officer and his mother taught Latin at Central Junior High School.  Roger graduated from Rochester High School in 1957 and attended the University of Minnesota.

Hagberg was killed on April 15, 1970 when he was thrown out of his car, and struck by two other vehicles.  Oakland Raiders' quarterback Daryle Lamonica attended Roger Hagberg's funeral in Rochester.

References

1939 births
1970 deaths
People from Winnebago, Minnesota
Players of American football from Minnesota
American football running backs
Canadian football running backs
Winnipeg Blue Bombers players
Oakland Raiders players
Minnesota Golden Gophers football players
Road incident deaths in California
American Football League players